Untamed is the fourth novel of the House of Night fantasy series written by P.C. Cast and Kristin Cast. The book was published on September 23, 2008, by St. Martin's Press, an extension of Macmillan Publishers, reaching #8 in ALA Teens Top 10 in 2009. Subsequently, it has been translated in over 20 different languages.

Zoey, the most gifted of the fledglings, has been ostracized by her tight group of friends after concealing Stevie Rae's resurrection and her relationship with professor Loren Blake. Now Aphrodite is plagued by visions of Zoey's death and something new:an old evil that has woken up.

Plot

Zoey is hiding in the stables with her horse, Persephone. After an internal debate she finally decides to talk with her friends. On the way to the cafeteria she feels the presence of Darkness and rushes inside. She tries to blend in and act normally but her friends ignore her and the situation degenerates with the appearance of a newly re-Marked Aphrodite, who chooses to sit with the 'nerd herd'. A confrontation is postponed by the arrival of new fledgling and famous archer James Stark.

After lunch, Zoey meets Aphrodite and Stevie Rae in her room. She finds out that Stevie Rae is mostly normal now and the only differences she experiences is an intense aversion to sunlight, and that Aphrodite's Mark is fake – she has mostly reverted to a human teenager, except for her visions. Zoey casts the circle and asks for guidance. Nyx appears to tell them that she still loves Aphrodite, that she was only safekeeping the Earth affinity for Stevie Rae, and that she reverted to human because her own humanity was too strong.

After the goddess' disappearance, they rush to a Council meeting. They find out that the Priestess of all vampyres, Shekinah, has come to the House of Night to reject Neferet's declaration of war on humans. She follows Zoey's advice to put Detective Marx on the case instead. Erik Night returns to the school and takes over Professor Nolan's drama class, much to Zoey's dismay. On her way back Zoey meets Stark and watches him practice. He confesses to her that he has a gift for archery – that he never misses a target – and it was discovered when he killed his mentor by mistake. Because he fears his power, he asks Zoey to use her powers to protect the others from him. Quickly after he confesses his gift, he starts to cough up blood. While he is dying, Zoey tells him about Stevie Rae and how he can come back to life.

Zoey, Darius and Aphrodite go to Street Cats, a local cat shelter, as Zoey has been searching for a community activity for the Dark Daughters. The organization is led by nuns from the Benedictine Abbey. Their leader, Sister Mary Angela, astounds Zoey with the contrast between her beliefs and John Heffer's.

At school she's late for drama class and Erik, the new teacher, makes her play Desdemona to his Othello in a Shakespeare improvisation. She's initially mad, but uses this as an opportunity to explain her feelings for him and kisses him just before the bell rings, but he storms off. Outside, she meets Darius who brings her to Aphrodite, revealing a gift for speed. Aphrodite has been having a vision of Sylvia Redbird's house and copies out a poem in her writing. Zoey calls her grandmother and together they uncover that the poem is a warning about an ancient Cherokee legend. The poem warns that Kalona, a fallen angel, will rise again throughout the help of the Tsi Sgili queen, a dark witch that uses pain. Her grandmother also warns her to beware the Raven Mockers, half-raven half-human offspring of Kalona. Zoey asks her to come to the House of Night to be safe.

Zoey then goes to Shekinah, and is attacked by a Raven Mocker on the way. She escapes Aphrodite's second vision of death by calling for Damien, who sends Air to banish the creature. Outside the Council chambers she happens to eavesdrop on a discussion between Neferet and Shekinah. She incredulously hears how Neferet manages to twist all the problems she's faced since the beginning of her change and make it seem as if they were Zoey's fault.

Back at school, Zoey begins a cleansing ritual at Shekinah's request. Zoey tries to introduce the red fledglings and Stevie Rae makes an appearance, but is interrupted by Neferet who brings an undead Stark and tries to frame Zoey. In the ensuing commotion, Neferet makes Stark shoot Stevie Rae, fulfilling another line of Aphrodite's poem. Her blood frees Kalona. Neferet reveals herself as the Tsi Sgili queen from the poem, and then kills Shekinah with her thoughts to prove it.

Characters

Zoey Redbird
Nyx
Erik Night
Stevie Rae
Neferet
Heath Luck
Aphrodite LaFont

Sylvia Redbird - Zoey's grandmother
Erin Bates
Shaunee Cole
Damien Maslin
Stark
Jack Twist - Damien's boyfriend
Darius - A son of Erebus

Reception
The book ranked #10 in the New York Times, USA Today Top 150 Bestseller List, where it remained for 58 weeks. The novel also entered the ALA Teens Top 10 in 2009, ranking #8.

"The mother and daughter writing team have created a believable world with characters that you can't let go of. The story is addictive and the cliffhanger ending in this installment has me wishing the months till March will fly by!"(ParaNormal Romance)

References

External links

 Untamed on the official website
 Untamed on the publisher's website
 First chapter of Untamed, on the publisher's website

2008 American novels
American young adult novels
American fantasy novels
American horror novels
American romance novels
American vampire novels
Vampire novels
House of Night series